John Roman Baker is a British poet, playwright and novelist.

Theatre 
His first play 'Limitations' launched the first season of the Gay Sweatshop Theatre company. In 1989, his play 'Crying Celibate Tears' was presented at the Sussex Aids Centre) within the context of the Brighton Festival. This 'festival within a festival' staged at the Sussex Aids Centre also included work by Philip Core, Peter Burton and Neil Bartlett. 'Crying Celibate Tears' received critical acclaim from the Brighton press, The Guardian and Plays and Players and was the launching pad for Aids Positive Underground Theatre, the company founded by Baker as a positive cultural response.

In June 1992, Michael Arditti, wrote in Plays International that: "...in England too the theatrical response [to AIDS] has been maturing ... and has come of age with John Roman Baker's "Crying Celibate Tears Trilogy" ... The keynotes of Mr Baker's writing are already in evidence; a barbed wit, an utter lack of sentimentality and a refusal to shy away from unpalatable truths ... the one horror which is happily absent being political correctness. ... In short, this is the real world: a humorous, harrowing, heartening world, and one which remains engrossing for the entire six hours of its length. ... Seen as a whole, the Trilogy is an overwhelming experience."

Performed plays include:

Crying Celibate Tears, 1989
The Ice Pick, 1990
Freedom to Party, 1991
The Crying Celibate Tears Trilogy, 1992
Easy, 1993
In One Take, 1994
The Last Century of Desire, 1995
Limitations, 1975
QueerBashed, 1995
Russian Roulette; 1998
The Pornographic Wall; 1998
Heroes, 1999
The Prostitution Plays, 2000
The Club Beautiful, 2001
Sexually Speaking 1+1, 2001
The War Fuck, 2002
East Side Skin, 2003
Things Happen, 2004
Romophobia, 2005
Prisoners of Sex, 2006
Touched, 2008

Adapted work by other writers:

Close to the Knives (David Wojnarowicz), 1993

Unperformed plays include:

Gala, 1990
Ibsen’s Ghosts, 2004
After a War, 2016
Remainers, Apologies Not Included, 2019

His work has been produced in many countries. From 1990–1996 the Brighton and Edinburgh Festivals often saw the first performances of his new plays. In 1990, his play The Ice Pick won the "Zap" Award for best theatre at the Brighton Festival jointly with the Satirikon theatre of Moscow. He was the first dramatist to adapt the work of American artist David Wojnarowicz for the stage. 'Close to the Knives' was performed at the 1993 Brighton Festival with the role of David Wojnarowicz played by actor Simon Merrells. In 1994 the success in Edinburgh of 'In One Take' led to performances at Teatri di Vita, Bologna, Italy. Since then, his work has continued to be popular in Italy and has been seen in Firenze, Modena, Forlí, L'Aquila, Reggio Emilia, Roma and Milano. His most popular work 'The Ice Pick' has been staged on multiple occasions in the UK and Italy as well as in the US at the Celebration Theatre, Los Angeles in 1993.

He moved to Amsterdam, the Netherlands in 1997, where he continued the work of Aputheatre until 2008.  During this period the focus of his work was mainly focused on the personal and social effects of pan-European migration following the collapse of communism.

In 1999 he updated and reworked 'The Ice Pick' for 2 characters under the title 'Heroes'. 'Heroes' was toured by Aputheatre around the Netherlands before being performed in Warsaw as part of the 1st Polish Gay Pride festival. 'The Prostitution Plays' was premiered for Warsaw Gay Pride in 2000 and in 2001 his play 'Sexually Speaking 1+1' was presented in Kiev, Ukraine.

Following its Amsterdam premiere, his play 'Prisoners of Sex' was translated into Italian by Antonio Serrano as 'Prigionieri del Sesso' and has been performed in Milan and Rome.

Short plays from 'Remainers, Apologies Not Included' were rejected by Cast Iron Theatre for an unrehearsed reading in December 2019. Among the two short plays submitted were queer male scenarios which included responses to homelessness, and ostensibly straight men cruising each other on Brighton Palace Pier.

Fiction & Poetry 
Published works include:
'Cast Down', Outposts Publications, London, 1968
'Gethsemane', Outposts Publications, London, 1969
'The Dark Antagonist', Unicorn Bookshop, Brighton, 1973. An unusual, mystical novel of a sexually repressed young man who encounters angelic forces.
'Poèmes à Tristan', G. Oberlé, Paris, 1974.
'No Fixed Ground', Wilkinson House, London, 2011. A vivid, hallucinatory novel that explores a young man's experience of friendship, sex and obsession amid the sexual liberation of mid-1970s England.
'The Sea and the City', Wilkinson House, London, 2012. Rich in symbolic imagery THE SEA AND THE CITY follows a young man's quest for salvation in a parallel reality.
'The Paris Syndrome', Wilkinson House, London, 2012. A dark exploration of illicit desire, madness and paternal responsibility.
'The Vicious Age', Wilkinson House, London, 2014. Set in Amsterdam, The Vicious Age explores the painful realities of life in a city that has become more materialistic and vicious in its constant need to renew itself.
'Brighton Darkness', Wilkinson House, London, 2015. Brighton Darkness is a collection of 17 stories that mostly relate to the city of Brighton & Hove. The stories span the decades from the 1950s to the present day and explore the many contradictions and quirks that define the city's unique character. Gay life in the city runs as a theme through many of the stories, while the author's experiences of other cities, Amsterdam, Paris and New York add a global context to the book. Another recurrent theme is that of return.
'Nick & Greg', Wilkinson House, London, 2016. Part One of the Nick & Greg Books, introducing the characters Nick and Greg: two gay teens growing up in 1950s Brighton.
'Time of Obsessions', Wilkinson House, London, 2017. Part Two of the Nick & Greg Books focuses on Greg's life after he leaves home and attempts to find his place first in Brighton and then in London. Set in the early sixties and featuring the iconic Chelsea lesbian and gay clubs Le Gigolo and Gateways Club.
'Nick's House', Wilkinson House, London, 2018. Part Three of the Nick & Greg Books. Nick and Greg, reunited in Brighton in the late 1960s defy convention and live by their own subversive sexual rules.
'Greg in Paris', Wilkinson House, London, 2019. Part Four of the Nick & Greg Books. Paris 1969. Greg and Bart go to Paris in search of Karel, and Greg is led into unexplored physical, emotional and philosophical territory.
'Le Far West', Wilkinson House, London, 2019. A fictional study of one man's experiences in a Paris gay porn cinema in 1988.
'2020', Wilkinson House, London, 2020. Alex and Paul meet at the beginning of a crisis that will engulf the world, and they choose to defy the darkness ahead.
'Love & Cowardice', Wilkinson House, London, 2021. Part Five of the Nick & Greg Books. Brighton 1973. Nick meets Nathan, a young supporter of the Gay Liberation Front. There is news from Bart, Karel & Greg and an encounter with Bill Butler at Brighton's Unicorn Bookshop.

Personal life 
John Roman Baker spent his childhood and much of his adolescence in Brighton, England. At the age of 19 he moved to Paris, where for several years he worked at the British Institute. His poetry was encouraged by the then director of the British Institute, Francis Scarfe. Later, in 1974 a volume of his poetry "Poèmes à Tristan" was published in French by Gérard Oberlé, translated by Françoise du Chaxel, and with an introduction by Jeanne Fayard. He has always considered himself foremost a poet and a vein of poetry continues in his plays and novels.

In 1970 he moved from Paris back to Brighton. His poetic novel 'The Dark Antagonist' was published by the Unicorn Bookshop, Brighton in 1973.

John Roman Baker was active in the Gay Liberation Front in Brighton and participated in the organization's pionerering "Gay Day" in 1972 and first Gay Pride March in 1973. 

Unwelcome notoriety was achieved when in 1976 he appeared with Tony Whitehead (later to become the first chairperson of the Terence Higgins Trust) in a Southern Television program about Gay Rights. They were pictured together kissing as one of them met the other off a train at Brighton station. As a result of this, Whitehead was immediately fired by his employer British Home Stores. A national outcry galvanised the gay rights movement led by CHE (The Campaign for Homosexual Equality) and GLF (Gay Liberation Front).

In 1997 he left Brighton for Amsterdam, where he was given the freedom to create and present new work at the theatre in the former COC Amsterdam building on Rozenstraat until its closure in 2007.

In 2014 he returned to England and now lives and works again in Brighton from where he has created a series of modern historical gay fiction 'The Nick & Greg Books'. The books chart the lives of two gay teenagers, Nick & Greg, who meet as teens in Brighton in the late 1950s. The books chart their lives and relationships from the 1957 to 2019. The books chronicle not only the massive social changes that occur, but also key literary and cultural influences. The two final books in the series 'Nick's Fugue' and 'Greg at the Station' are scheduled for publication in 2022/23.

In August 2018 and November 2019 he attended the Salon du Livre Gay (Gay Book Fair) in Paris to present 'The Nick & Greg Books' and launch the fourth book in the series 'Greg in Paris' as well as the limited edition hardcover 'Le Far West'.

In June 2020 a new novel entitled '2020' was published. The book, written immediately before the Covid-19 lockdowns began in France and the United Kingdom, presents two characters, Alex and Paul, seeking to defy the coming crisis.

John Roman Baker, whose health is in decline, will continue writing poetry and what he calls 'fictions' for as long as he can.

References 

English gay writers
English LGBT rights activists
Living people
People from Brighton
Place of birth missing (living people)
English LGBT dramatists and playwrights
English LGBT novelists
English LGBT poets
20th-century English novelists
21st-century English novelists
English male poets
English male dramatists and playwrights
English male novelists
Gay dramatists and playwrights
Gay novelists
Gay poets
20th-century English male writers
21st-century English male writers
Year of birth missing (living people)